Ruslan Khasanshin (born February 7, 1985) is a professional ice hockey player who currently plays the 2010–11 season in the Kontinental Hockey League with Metallurg Novokuznetsk.

References

External links 

Living people
Metallurg Novokuznetsk players
1985 births
Russian ice hockey centres
Sportspeople from Tolyatti